The northern narrow–banded skink (Eremiascincus intermedius) is a species of skink found in the Northern Territory and Western Australia.

References

Eremiascincus
Reptiles described in 1919
Taxa named by Richard Sternfeld